Heliconilla is a genus of spiders in the family Zodariidae. It was first described in 2012 by Dankittipakul, Jocqué & Singtripop. , it contains 9 Asian species.

Species
Heliconilla comprises the following species:
 H. aculeata Dankittipakul, Jocqué & Singtripop, 2012 — Thailand
 H. cochleata Dankittipakul, Jocqué & Singtripop, 2012 — Vietnam
 H. crassa Dankittipakul, Jocqué & Singtripop, 2012 — Thailand
 H. furcata Dankittipakul, Jocqué & Singtripop, 2012 — Thailand
 H. globularis Dankittipakul, Jocqué & Singtripop, 2012 — Thailand, Malaysia, Singapore
 H. irrorata (Thorell, 1887) — Myanmar
 H. mesopetala Dankittipakul, Jocqué & Singtripop, 2012 — Myanmar, Thailand
 H. oblonga (Zhang & Zhu, 2009) — China, Thailand
 H. thaleri (Dankittipakul & Schwendinger, 2009) (type) — Thailand

References

Zodariidae
Araneomorphae genera
Spiders of Asia